Monika Meyer (born 23 June 1972 in Berlin) is a retired German football striker. She scored 5 goals in 27 caps for the German national team between 1997 and 1999.

References

1972 births
Living people
German women's footballers
Germany women's international footballers
Footballers from Berlin
UEFA Women's Championship-winning players
Women's association football forwards
1999 FIFA Women's World Cup players